This is a list of presidents of the Landtag of Liechtenstein.

The current president is Albert Frick, since 2013.

Presidents of the Landtag (1862–present)

References

External links
Official website of the Landtag of Liechtenstein

Politics of Liechtenstein
Liechtenstein